Collins House, also known as the Collins Residence, designed by Ward Wellington Ward, was listed on the National Register of Historic Places in 1997.

It is adjacent to the Kelly House, also designed by Ward.

The house exhibits decorative details such as stained glass in windows, as appears in other Ward houses.

References

External links

Houses in Syracuse, New York
National Register of Historic Places in Syracuse, New York
Houses on the National Register of Historic Places in New York (state)
Houses completed in 1919